Nerve is a 2016 American techno-thriller adventure film directed by Henry Joost and Ariel Schulman and written by Jessica Sharzer, based on the 2012 novel of the same name by Jeanne Ryan.

The film premiered at the SVA Theater on July 12, 2016 and was theatrically released on July 27, 2016, by Lionsgate. It received positive reviews from critics for its energy and the chemistry of its cast, and grossed over $85 million worldwide against a $19 million budget.

Plot

High school senior Venus "Vee" Delmonico longs to leave Staten Island for college, but is avoiding telling her mother as they are still mourning the death of her older brother. Her friend Sydney becomes popular in Nerve: an online reality game where people either enlist as "players" or pay to watch as "watchers". Players accept dares voted on by watchers, try to become the winner of that day, and receive monetary rewards.

Sydney chastises Vee's unadventurous nature so Vee signs up as a player on Nerve. She learns that all dares must be recorded on the player's phone, earned money will be revoked if a player fails or bails on a dare, and that "snitches get stitches."

Vee's first dare is to kiss a stranger at a diner. At the diner she kisses Ian, who dances and sings to Vee, revealing he's another player on a dare. The watchers dare Ian to take her into Manhattan on his motorcycle.

In Manhattan they are dared to try on expensive formal attire. Their street clothes are stolen and the watchers dare them to leave the store, so they flee in their undergarments. They return to Ian's motorbike where they find the expensive clothes paid for by the watchers.

Vee is dared to get a tattoo chosen by Ian, and Ian is dared to ride his motorbike through the city blindfolded at 60 mph, using Vee to steer his body; once completed, the two kiss. Vee and Ian become among Nerve’s top players.

Jealous of Vee's rise of popularity on Nerve, Sydney accepts a dare at a party to cross a ladder between two buildings, but she bails and is eliminated from the game. Vee catches Sydney making out with J.P., a boy Vee likes. After Vee and Sydney argue, Vee’s hacker friend, Tommy reveals that Ian was dared into making them argue. Vee breaks up her partnership with Ian, and then completes the ladder dare. Realising how dangerous Nerve is, Vee attempts to report the game to the police, but is disbelieved. As a result, all of the money in Vee's and her mom's bank accounts are removed. Popular player Ty knocks Vee out to keep her in the game.

Vee wakes up in a shipping container with "snitches get stitches" on the walls. She escapes and finds Ian, who confesses that he and Ty were players whose friend was killed in a dare. When they tried to alert the authorities, their families' jobs, bank accounts, and identities were confiscated. Vee has now joined them in the secret third category of the game: "prisoners". If a prisoner can reach and win the day’s final round, they regain everything.

Sydney decides to help Tommy's hacker friends disable Nerve by altering the game's online code, but it is impossible to simply shut down Nerve, as all the watchers phones and profiles act as a distributed server.

Vee and Ian earn the two spots in the final dare, which takes place at Battery Weed. The winner will be whoever shoots the other with the handguns they’ve been given. Ian offers her the win, but when she also refuses to shoot, Ty jumps from the audience and takes Ian's place. He tells the watchers to vote wherever or not he should shoot Vee. The watchers vote for Ty to shoot Vee, so he does so.

Just then, Tommy and his hackers modify Nerve’s source code to decrypt the watcher's code names into their real names as well as sending them a message: "You are an accessory to murder". The panicked watchers immediately log out, closing all the servers and ending the game. Despondent over Vee's apparent death, Ian aims his gun at Ty, but Vee suddenly sits up, revealing that she and Ty had staged her murder to scare the watchers into disbanding Nerve, shutting it down and becomes offline. Tommy's hacker friends restore the stolen money and identities.

A few months later, Vee and Sydney have reconciled, Vee and Ian are a couple, and Vee is attending California Arts. Ian reveals his real name to be Sam and they walk away together as the sun rises.

Cast

Production 
Directors Ariel Schulman and Henry Joost had previously dealt with similar themes in their documentary Catfish. On their attraction to a film based around the Internet, they stated, "Most things aren’t black and white. The Internet is neither good nor bad; it just depends on how you use it", giving the example that the Nerve game could be both "a really empowering game, and it’s also the most awful thing that you can possibly imagine". The directors strived for a PG-13 rating, with Schulman stating "we wanted to make sure that younger teenagers could see it. We think it has an important message and they’ll dig it", with Joost adding "We weren’t interested in making a gross torture movie". In trying to keep the rating down, the directors axed a "sex dare" that "was ultimately just too dark and weird". 
The film has also a lighter ending and theme than the book, as the novel deals with a much darker plot and ending.
The team stated that the fast-changing nature of the Internet made it a tough subject to make a narrative feature about, with Joost noting that the app Periscope came out during the film development, which Joost called "like half-way to being Nerve".

In January 2015, it was announced that Emma Roberts and Dave Franco were set to star in the film. In April 2015, it was announced that Kimiko Glenn had joined the cast of the film, portraying the role of Emma Roberts' character's worried friend. The same day, it was announced that rapper Colson "Machine Gun Kelly" Baker had also joined the cast.

Filming 
Principal photography on the film began on April 13, 2015, in New York City. Production on the film concluded on June 5, 2015.

Release 
The film premiered at the School of Visual Arts in New York City on July 12, where the cast attended. It was also screened on July 21 at Comic-Con. The film was originally scheduled for September 16, 2016, but was eventually theatrically released on July 27, 2016.

Reception

Box office
Nerve grossed $38.6 million in the United States and Canada, and $46.5 million in other countries, for a worldwide total of $85.2 million, against a budget of $19 million.

The film was projected to gross around $10 million in its opening weekend and $15 million over its first five days from 2,538 theaters. The film grossed $3.7 million on its opening day and ended up finishing 8th at the box office in its opening weekend, grossing $9.4 million (a five-day total of $15.5 million).

Critical response
On Rotten Tomatoes, the film has an approval rating of 67% based on 138 reviews, with an average rating of 5.78/10. The site's critical consensus reads, "Nerves fast pace and charming leads help overcome a number of fundamental flaws, adding up to a teen-friendly thriller with enough energy to occasionally offset its muddled execution." On Metacritic, the film has a weighted average score of 58 out of 100 based on 33 critics, indicating "mixed or average reviews". Audiences polled by CinemaScore gave the film an average grade of "A−" on an A+ to F scale.

Scott Tobias of Uproxx wrote, "Though the ending surrenders to a tsk-tsk-ing morality play that turns on the mob the game (and the film) has so smartly orchestrated, Nerve is the rare virtual thriller that understands how social media actually works and the addictive little subcultures that can spin out of it." Dave Palmer of The Reel Deal gave the film 7/10, saying, "It is a lot of fun, and not even in a turn-your-brain off kind of way. The film actually has some smart things to say about teenagers, their phones and what people will do to get internet famous and it is all delivered in a colorful little package."

Accolades
The film was nominated at the People's Choice Awards in the category "Favorite Thriller Movie".

Legacy
Nerve has been mentioned in relation to the real-life dare game called Blue Whale Challenge, which attracted media attention starting from 2016 and shares some similarities with what's depicted in the film.

References

External links
 
 
 
 
 

2016 films
2010s adventure thriller films
2010s mystery thriller films
2010s teen films
American adventure thriller films
American mystery thriller films
American teen films
2010s English-language films
Films about computing
Films about security and surveillance
Films about social media
Films based on American novels
Films based on thriller novels
Films directed by Henry Joost and Ariel Schulman
Films scored by Rob Simonsen
Films set in 2017
Films set in New York City
Films shot in New York City
Lionsgate films
Techno-thriller films
Teen adventure films
Teen mystery films
Teen thriller films
2010s American films